Mehdiabad (also Romanized as Mehdīābād; also known as Kaleh Jār and Kareh Chār) is a village in Jushaq Rural District, in the Central District of Delijan County, Markazi Province, Iran. At the 2006 census, its population was 134, in 68 families.

References 

Populated places in Delijan County